Gowhar Kola (also Romanized as Gowhar Kolā; also known as Gar Kolā) is a village in Birun Bashm Rural District, Kelardasht District, Chalus County, Mazandaran Province, Iran. At the 2006 census, its population was 138, in 42 families.

References 

Populated places in Chalus County